Piotr Szymiczek (born May 21, 1982 in Wodzisław Śląski) is a Polish footballer (defender) who plays for Świt Nowy Dwór Mazowiecki.

Career

Club
In February 2011, he joined Świt Nowy Dwór Mazowiecki.

References

External links
 

1982 births
Living people
Polish footballers
Stal Stalowa Wola players
Odra Wodzisław Śląski players
Kolejarz Stróże players
People from Wodzisław Śląski
Sportspeople from Silesian Voivodeship
Association football defenders